Silver Lake is a natural lake in South Dakota, United States of America.

Silver Lake received its name on account of the appearance of the clear lake water.

See also
List of lakes in South Dakota

References

Lakes of South Dakota
Bodies of water of Miner County, South Dakota